Les Geneveys-sur-Coffrane railway station is a railway station in the municipality of Val-de-Ruz, in the Swiss canton of Neuchâtel. It is an intermediate stop on the standard gauge Neuchâtel–Le Locle-Col-des-Roches line of Swiss Federal Railways.

Services
The following services stop at Les Geneveys-sur-Coffrane:

References

External links 
 
 

Railway stations in the canton of Neuchâtel
Swiss Federal Railways stations